Austin College is a private liberal arts college affiliated with the Presbyterian Church (USA) and located in Sherman, Texas.

About 1,300 students are enrolled at the college. Students are required to live on campus for the first three years of their education in order to foster a close-knit and community oriented campus lifestyle. Austin College actively promotes study abroad programs; 70% of graduates have at least one international study experience during college, and about 82% of students are involved in research. The college cultivates close interaction between students and professors via a 13:1 student to faculty ratio and an average class size of fewer than 25 students.

Chartered in November 1849, Austin College remains the oldest institution of higher education in Texas to be operating under its original charter and name as recognized by the State Historical Survey Committee. The college was profiled in all three editions of Colleges That Change Lives.

History

The college was founded on October 13, 1849, in Huntsville, Texas, by the Hampden–Sydney and Princeton-educated missionary Dr. Daniel Baker. Signed by Texas Governor George Wood, the charter of Austin College was modeled after those of Harvard, Yale, and Princeton.

Baker named the school for the Texas historical figure Stephen F. Austin after the original land on which it was built was donated by the Austin family. Two other important figures in Texas history, Sam Houston and Anson Jones, served on the original board of trustees for the college.

Austin College's founding president was Irish-born Presbyterian minister Samuel McKinney, who served as the school's president a second time from 1862 to 1871. Under the tenure of the fourth president of Austin College, Reverend Samuel Magoffin Luckett, Austin College had several yellow fever epidemics and complications related to the Civil War. Texas Synod of the Presbyterian Church decided the college would be relocated to Sherman in 1876. Construction of the new campus in north Texas came in the form of "Old Main," a two-story, red brick structure, which occurred between 1876 and 1878.

On January 21 of 1913, Old Main was set ablaze and burnt to the ground in a matter of hours. A professor of Austin College, Davis Foute Eagleton described the incident: Following the fire, the citizens of Sherman raised $50,000 to help the college rebuild. Now one of the oldest buildings on the Austin College campus, Sherman Hall housed administrative offices, an auditorium-chapel, and a library. Now the home of the humanities division, Sherman Hall boasted such guests as Harry Houdini, Harry Blackstone Sr., Madame Schumann-Heink, William Howard Taft, and George H.W. Bush. y

In 1965, the promotional film Atmosphere for Learning was produced for the college.

In 1994, Dr. Oscar Page joined the community as its 14th president. Under his tenure, 1994–2009, Dr. Page increased the school's endowment by nearly 80%, due in large part to his dedicated fundraising efforts as evidenced by the success of the "Campaign for the New Era;" a total of $120 million were raised and the campaign was heralded as the largest fundraiser in Austin College's history. Dr. Page orchestrated the construction of Jordan Family Language House, Jerry E. Apple Stadium, the Robert J. and Mary Wright Campus Center, the Robert M. and Joyce A. Johnson 'Roo Suites, and the Betsy Dennis Forster Art Studio Complex; as well as the renovation of  the David E. and Cassie L. Temple Center for Teaching and Learning at Thompson House and of Wortham Center, and creation of the John A. and Katherine G. Jackson Technology Center, the Margaret Binkley Collins and William W. Collins, Jr., Alumni Center, and the College Green in Honor of John D. and Sara Bernice Moseley and Distinguished Faculty.

Dr. Marjorie Hass joined the campus in 2009 as both its first female and Jewish faith president. Under her leadership, the college saw the construction of the IDEA Center and two new housing complexes—the Flats at Brockett Court and the Village on Grand. The IDEA Center is a 103,000 square ft. facility which includes multi-disciplinary and multi-purpose classrooms, laboratories, lecture halls and the largest telescope in the region found in Adams Observatory. It is  a LEED Gold certified facility.

Rankings

Listed in the U.S. News & World Report "Guide to the 331 Most Interesting Colleges", Austin College is ranked #117 on the 2019 list of National Liberal Arts Colleges. Austin College was ranked 79th in 2016. President O'Day took office in 2017, and Austin College slipped to 117th in 2020, the lowest ranking National Liberal Arts College in Texas.

Academics
Austin College offers about 35 majors and pre-professional programs for study, and students can also create a specialized major to match their academic interests. The college is known for its nationally recognized five-year Master of Arts in Teaching program, its pre-medical, international studies, and pre-law programs, which draw many students to the campus. The college has a music program, and supports the Austin College A Cappella Choir and the Sherman Symphony Orchestra made up of students and local musicians, and assorted smaller musical ensembles.

Athletics
Austin College joined the Southern Collegiate Athletic Conference (SCAC) on July 1, 2006, replacing Rose-Hulman Institute of Technology. Austin College was previously a member of the American Southwest Conference (ASC), Texas Intercollegiate Athletic Association, and Texas Conference. In 2017, the Austin College football team joined the Southern Athletic Association in football, while remaining a member of the SCAC across all other sports.

Baseball 
In 2007, the first year of participating in the SCAC, the Austin College baseball team won the conference tournament, beating Millsaps College 9–7 in the finals. The Roos finished the season with a win–loss record of 22–25. The tournament win was the first ever conference championship for the Roos and the first time the program had ever been in the Regional tournament. Carl Iwasaki was the head coach for the Roos from 2005 until 2010.  He won two coach of the year awards, the first in 2006 while the Roos were still in the ASC and the second, coming in 2007 after the Roos had joined the SCAC. Coach Iwasaki was replaced by James Rise for the 2011 season who coached for four seasons. Under Rise, the Roos went  11–24 in 2011, 8–29 in 2012, 12–29 in 2013, and 6–33 in 2014.

Alumni
 Ryan Allen, opera singer
 Marshall Applewhite, leader of the Heaven's Gate religious cult.
 Gene Babb, President, National Football Scouting Inc.; former player for the Dallas Cowboys, Houston Oilers and San Francisco 49ers
 Thomas Henry Ball, Texas politician and member of the United States House of Representatives
 Smith Ballew, actor and singer
 Billy Bookout, American football player
 Hannibal Boone, 16th Attorney General of Texas
 Byron Boston, a football official in the National Football League
 John Bucy III, Texas State Representative (2019–present)
 Joe Coomer, American football player
 Deborah Crombie, New York Times bestselling author.
 Philip Diehl, Director of the United States Mint. 
 Nancy Duff, Stephen Colwell Associate Professor of Christian Ethics at Princeton Theological Seminary
 Scott Eder, sports executive, marathoner and triathlete
 Larry Fedora, former head football coach at University of North Carolina at Chapel Hill
 Maurice Harper, American football player
 David Lee "Tex" Hill, World War II triple ace, member of the Flying Tigers. John Wayne based his character on Hill in the movie Flying Tigers
 John Hitt, president of the University of Central Florida
 Ron Kirk, former Mayor of Dallas and former United States Trade Representative
 Candace Kita, actress
 Haskell Monroe, notable educator and university administrator
 Ray Morehart, baseball player, Chicago White Sox, New York Yankees, played with Babe Ruth and Lou Gehrig
 John Moseley, educator and college president
 Carroll Pickett, Presbyterian minister, author and advocate for abolishing the death penalty
 Homer Rainey, college president and professor
 Charlie Robertson, American Major League Baseball pitcher
 Walter Rogers, United States Representative
 Reggie Smith, Texas State Representative (2018–present)
 Dan Stoenescu, Romanian diplomat, ambassador and former Minister for Romanians Abroad 
 Vern Sutton, operatic tenor
 Tom Thompson, NCAA Football record holder
 Larry Tidwell, head women's basketball coach at NCAA Division I programs Lamar University and University of Texas–Pan American.
 Stephen Carpenter, Soccer Player
 Brandon McInnis, anime and game voice actor

Faculty
Light Townsend Cummins, State Historian of Texas, Texas history author
George Diggs, biologist, Texas flora
Joseph Havel, artist, current director of the Glassell School of Art
Jerry B. Lincecum, English scholar, Texas folklore author
Shelton Williams, political science and international studies scholar

References

External links

 
Official athletics website

 
Private universities and colleges in Texas
Education in Grayson County, Texas
Educational institutions established in 1849
Universities and colleges accredited by the Southern Association of Colleges and Schools
Universities and colleges affiliated with the Presbyterian Church (USA)
Buildings and structures in Grayson County, Texas
1849 establishments in Texas
Bibliographic Association of the Red River